SMA Negeri 1 Blitar, also known as SMASA, is a public senior high school which is located at Jalan A. Yani 112 Blitar, East Java, Indonesia. This school was established on August 22, 1955, occupying a former Dutch school building, the Noormal School I.

Notable alumni 
 Boediono
 Admiral Agus Suhartono
 Mochammad Jasin

References

External links 
  Official site

Schools in Indonesia
Blitar
Schools in East Java